The Mlechchha dynasty (c. 650 - 900) ruled Kamarupa from their capital at Harruppesvar in present-day Tezpur, Assam, after the fall of the Varman dynasty. According to historical records, there were twenty one rulers in this dynasty, but the line is obscure and names of some intervening rulers are not known. Like all other Kamarupa dynasties a semi-mythical lineage from Narakasura was constructed to accord legitimacy to their rule. The Mlechchha dynasty in Kamarupa was followed by the Pala kings. The dynasty is unrelated to the previous Varman dynasty.

Sources 
Salasthambha is first mentioned in an inscription 175 years into the rule of the dynasty.

The Hayunthal Copper Plates, dated to the middle of 9th Century CE, mentions multiple kings from the dynasty in a chronological fashion — Salastamba, Vijaya, Palaka, Kumara, Vajradeva, Harsavarman, Balavarman, [unnamed], Harjaravarman, and Vanamala. The Tejpur Copper Plates (since lost), roughly dated to the same spans, primarily chronicles Vanamala — other rulers like Pralambha, and Harjaravarman are mentioned. The Parbatiya Copper Plates, again roughly dated to the middle of 9th Century CE, chronicles Vanamala.

Origins and etymology
It is not clear how Salasthambha, the first of this dynasty, came to power.

Suniti Kumar Chatterji as well Dineshchandra Sircar propose that Salastambha was a Bodo-Kachari chief of Mech, which was later sanskritized to Mleccha; an inscription from the reign of a king from the later Pala dynasty claims him to be a mlecchādhināth (Lord of The Mlecchas). An illegible explanation of theirs being called mlecchas was provided over the Hayunthal Plates, too. 
Symbolically, Mleccha designation could mean suppression of Vedic religion and the predominance of tantric vamacara practised by saivites and saktas. So, ethnic identity of Salastambha family could be same as Varmans but came to be known as mlecchas.

According to some historians, the remnant of the Mlechchha kingdom formed the later Kachari kingdom.

Rulers
The grants of Ratnapala give the list of 21 kings from Salastambha to his line.

 Salastamba (650-670)
 Vijaya alias Vigrahastambha
 Palaka
 Kumara
 Vajradeva
 Harshadeva alias Harshavarman (725-745)
 Balavarman II
 Jivaraja
 Digleswaravarman
 Pralambha
 Harjjaravarman (815-832)
 Vanamalavarmadeva (832-855)
 Jayamala alias Virabahu (855-860)
 Balavarman III (860-880)
 Tyagasimha (890-900)

References

Bibliography 

 

 
 
 
 
 

 
 

Dynasties of India
People from Kamarupa